Desulfocapsa is a bacterial genus from the family Desulfocapsaceae.

See also 
 List of bacterial orders
 List of bacteria genera

References

Further reading 
 
 
 

Desulfobacterales
Bacteria genera